Li Wei (born September 1960) is a general (Shangjiang) of the People's Liberation Army (PLA) of China and the current political commissar of People's Liberation Army Strategic Support Force. He was promoted to the rank of major general (shaojiang) in July 2008, lieutenant general (zhongjiang) in July 2016, and general (Shangjiang) in December 2020.

Biography
Li was born in Jiyuan, Henan, in September 1960. He served in Lanzhou Military Region for a long time. He was director of Political Department of the 47th Group Army in July 2007 and its deputy political commissar in 2010. In He became a member of the Standing Committee of the CPC Xinjiang Uygur Autonomous Region Committee in July 2015 and again in 2018. In December 2020, he was appointed political commissar of People's Liberation Army Strategic Support Force, replacing Zheng Weiping.

References

1960 births
Living people
People from Jiyuan
People's Liberation Army generals from Henan
Delegates to the 13th National People's Congress
People's Republic of China politicians from Henan
Chinese Communist Party politicians from Henan